Verrallia is a genus of flies belonging to the family Pipunculidae.

Species
Verrallia andreei Aczél, 1948
Verrallia aucta (Fallén, 1817)
Verrallia csikii Aczél, 1940
Verrallia exstincta Meunier, 1903
Verrallia rebunensis Morakote, 1990
Verrallia spectabilis Collin, 1941
Verrallia succinia Meunier, 1903
Verrallia virginica Banks, 1915

References

Pipunculidae
Brachycera genera
Diptera of Europe
Diptera of Asia
Diptera of North America
Taxa named by Josef Mik